Herbert M. Merrill (September 13, 1871 in Campton, Grafton County, New Hampshire – March 5, 1956 in Schenectady, New York) was an American politician from New York. He was the first Socialist member of the New York State Assembly.

Life
He attended the common schools in Boston, Massachusetts, and graduated from Plymouth High School (New Hampshire) in 1888. Then he went to work as an armature winder at the General Electric plant in Schenectady. He was a founder of Local No. 247 of the Electrical Workers Union. Through all his life, he was an avid reader, and was considered by Dixon Ryan Fox, President of Union College, the most widely read person of his time.

In November 1911, the Socialist Party of America won the elections in Schenectady County by pluralities, and Merrill was elected to the Assembly, sitting in the 135th New York State Legislature in 1912. Before and after this tenure, he was a candidate for office on the Socialist, and later the American Labor ticket, at many elections for more than thirty years. He was Secretary of the Socialist Party in the State of New York for about 15 years.

He died on March 5, 1956, in Ellis Hospital in Schenectady, New York; and was buried at the Blair Cemetery in Campton, New Hampshire.

Sources
 Official New York from Cleveland to Hughes by Charles Elliott Fitch (Hurd Publishing Co., New York and Buffalo, 1911, Vol. IV; pg. 347, 349, 351f, 354, 356f and 359)
 LUNN LOSES SCHENECTADY in NYT on November 5, 1913
 HERBERT MERRILL DIES; Ex-Assemblyman Was Liberal and Socialist Party Leader in NYT on March 7, 1956 (subscription required)

External links

1871 births
1956 deaths
Socialist Party of America politicians from New York (state)
Politicians from Schenectady, New York
Members of the New York State Assembly
People from Campton, New Hampshire